Governor Hoffman may refer to:

Harold G. Hoffman (1896–1954), 41st Governor of New Jersey
John T. Hoffman (1828–1888), 23rd Governor of New York